Christian Schroder may refer to:

 Christian Schrøder, Danish film actor, screenwriter and director
 Christian Schröder, German sailor